FARP may refer to:

 Revolutionary Armed Forces of the People, originally the armed wing of the African Party for the Independence of Guinea and Cape Verde during the struggle against Portuguese rule; the national armed forces of Guinea-Bissau since 1973
 Fantasy Art Resource Project, a collection of art and writing tutorials hosted by Elfwood
 Forward arming and refuelling point (or forward area refueling/rearming point), a NATO/US term for an area designated for the re-arming and re-fueling of aircraft